"The ABC's of Love" is a song written by George Goldner and Richard Barrett and performed by Frankie Lymon and The Teenagers featuring Jimmy Wright and His Orchestra. It reached #8 on the US R&B chart and #77 on the Billboard pop chart in 1956. The song was featured on their 1956 album, The Teenagers Featuring Frankie Lymon.

Other versions
The Persuasions released a version of the song as the B-side to their single "The Sun".

References

1956 songs
1956 singles
The Teenagers songs
Gee Records singles
Songs written by George Goldner
Songs written by Richie Barrett